American Vampire is an  American comic book series created by writer Scott Snyder and drawn by artist Rafael Albuquerque. It was published by DC Comics under its Vertigo imprint. American Vampire continued under the newly-created DC Black Label imprint after Vertigo was closed in January 2020.
The series imagines vampires as a population made up of many different secret species, and charts moments of vampire evolution and inter-species conflict throughout history. The focus of the series is a new American bloodline of vampires, born in the American West in the late 19th century. The first of this new species is a notorious outlaw named Skinner Sweet, who wakes from death, after being infected, to find he has become a new kind of vampire, something stronger and faster than what came before, impervious to sunlight, with a new set of strengths and weaknesses. The series goes on to track his movements through various decades of American history—along with the movements of his first and only known progeny: Pearl Jones, a young woman working as a struggling actress in the 1920s silent film industry when she is attacked by a coven of European vampires hiding in Hollywood. Sweet saves her (uncharacteristically) by giving her his blood, thereby turning her into an American vampire like him, at which point she seeks revenge on the classic vampires who attacked her in life. The complicated and charged relationship Jones has with Sweet is another focus of the series.
The first five issues featured two stories—one by Snyder and the other by Stephen King, both drawn by Rafael Albuquerque. With the sixth issue, Scott Snyder took over as sole writer. The original series ran from 2010–2013 and lasted 34 issues. A second series called American Vampire: Second Cycle ran from 2014–2015 and lasted 11 issues and the third and final series called American Vampire: 1976 ran from December 2020 – October 2021 and lasted 10 issues.

American Vampire spun off two mini-series. The first, "Survival of the Fittest", illustrated by Sean Murphy focuses on the cases files of the V.M.S., the vampire hunting organization of the series. The second, "Lord of Nightmares", illustrated by Dustin Nguyen further focuses on the mythology presented by "Survival of the Fittest". A one shot co-written by Snyder and Albuquerque (who also illustrates the 64-page issue), entitled "Long Road to Hell" which features vampire hunter Travis Kidd, was released in June 2013. Two American Vampire anthologies have also been released, the first in 2013 and the second in 2016.

Plot 
The series explores notions of vampire evolution and traces the bloodline of a new kind of vampire, an American species, with new powers and characteristics, through various decades of American history.

The first story arc (issues #1–5) features two story arcs. The first takes place in 1925 from the point of view of an aspiring actress in L.A. who becomes the second American Vampire and works to get her revenge on those who turned her. The second is of a writer at a book conference due to the reediting of his book, Bad Blood. Here, the author claims that his work- which has been long considered a fictional western/terror story- is actually based on true events which he has either witnessed or has collected reliable information on.

Publication history 
This series publication began on March 17, 2010, with the release of American Vampire #1.  This is the first comic which features original Stephen King scripting who was contracted to the initial five issues.

Issues

First Cycle

Second Cycle

Others

Collected editions

Omnibus editions

Characters 
 Skinner Sweet – An outlaw who lived in the Wild West. He was turned into a vampire when the blood from Percy, a vampire banker, fell into his eye during a fight while he was escaping from being hanged. After being trapped into a coffin sunken sixty-six feet under water, he escaped and hunted the vampires who tried to kill him. In 1936, Sweet has relocated to Las Vegas, where he opened a brothel, using the name Jim Smoke. Later Skinner finds himself swept up into WWII as he hunts down a threat to his possible (?) with Pearl.
 Pearl Jones – An aspiring actress in the 1920s who was ambushed by a group of vampires led by a vampire director named B.D. Bloch during one of his parties. She was left for dead at a pit in the desert, but was saved by Sweet when he dropped his blood on her eye, turning her into a vampire. She has relocated to Arrowhead, California, using the surname of her husband, Henry Preston, while she is hiding from the other vampires.
 Hattie Hargrove – Hattie is Pearl's ambitious and slightly put upon roommate in Hollywood, sharing an apartment with the main character before Pearl is murdered by vampires and transformed by Skinner Sweet.
 Henry Preston – Pearl Jones' husband, a World War 1 veteran who works as a jazz musician who decided to help Pearl to enact her revenge against the vampires who almost killed her. Prior to arriving in Hollywood and working as a resident guitarist at a speak easy where Pearl worked, Henry was a journeymen Guitar player. He isn't intimidated by Pearl's vampirism, but sometimes he feels some sadness by the fact that while he's getting older, Pearl isn't. Henry later dies stopping Hattie.
 Mr. B.D. Bloch – A European vampire masquerading as a Hollywood Mogul.
 James "Jim" Book – A detective who worked for Pinkerton Agency, he hunted and arrested Skinner Sweet, who turned him into a vampire in retaliation. Before being consumed by his vampiric instincts, he extracts a promise from Abilena, she is to kill him in exchange for fathering her child that same night.
 Abilena Camillo/Book – Daughter of Felix Camillo, her mother died at birth. She is James Book's god-daughter, though she professes an unrequited love for him once she grows up. After his death, she takes his surname and together with her daughter Felicia Book hunts Skinner Sweet for an organization called The Vassals of the Morning Star.
Felix Camillo – Father of Abilena Camillo/Book Deputy to James Book, and Grandfather of Felicia.
Will Bunting – the Writer of bad blood and witness to the birth of Skinner Sweet as the first documented American Vampire.
Percy – Leader of a cabal of vampires taking advantage of western expansion, and the maker of Skinner Sweet.
Finch – Human servant of Percy and the Vampire cabal and employer of James Book.
Mimiteh – A Young Shoshone woman who was the first actual American vampire though her exploits were lost to history.
 Felicia Book – Fathered by James Book and his god-daughter Abilena on the night he dies. She is a member of The Vassals of the Morning Star, an organization which hunts vampires. She seems to have unique abilities due to her father's vampirism, though the extent of her abilities is yet to be seen.
 Jack Straw – Another member of the Vassals of the Morning Star, Straw was partnered with Felicia Book while investigating vampire activity in Las Vegas.
 Cashel "Cash" McCogan – As Chief of the Las Vegas Police Department, Cash became involved with Jack Straw and Felicia Book while investigating the grisly murders of several persons responsible for the construction of the Hoover Dam (then called the Boulder Dam).
 Calvin Poole – a soldier in World War 2 who served with Henry Preston during the "Ghost War" story arc. He was accidentally turned into a vampire after a bottle of Pearl's Blood broke and infected him.

Notes

References

External links
 

Comics by Stephen King
DC Comics vampires
Fantasy comics
Eisner Award winners for Best New Series
Comics by Scott Snyder